Heliocosma is a genus of moths, mostly placed in the Tortricoidea superfamily.

Species
Heliocosma anthodes Meyrick, 1910
Heliocosma argyroleuca Lower, 1916
Heliocosma exoeca Meyrick, 1910
Heliocosma incongruana (Walker, 1863)
Heliocosma melanotypa Turner, 1925
Heliocosma rhodopnoana Meyrick, 1881

References

Tortricoidea